Magne Haldorsen  (31 October 1925 – 24 November 2005) was a Norwegian politician.

He was elected deputy representative to the Storting for the period 1973–1977 for the Christian Democratic Party. He replaced Bergfrid Fjose at the Storting in October 1973.

References

1925 births
2005 deaths
People from Bømlo
Christian Democratic Party (Norway) politicians
Members of the Storting